Eskender Ametovich Mustafaiev (also transliterated Mustafayev or Mustafaev, born July 17, 1981) is a paralympic swimmer. He competed for Ukraine at the 2012 Summer Paralympics, winning gold in the 50 metre freestyle S4, and at the 2013 IPC Swimming World Championships, winning two gold and two silver medals. Mustafaiev competed for Russia at the 2015 IPC Swimming World Championships, winning gold and bronze medals.

Personal 
Mustafaiev was born in Chinaz, Tashkent Region, Uzbek SSR, Soviet Union. He is from Aqyar/Sevastopil, Ukraine.  When he was five years old, he was diagnosed with Charcot–Marie–Tooth disease. He is married and has a daughter with his wife Yulia. He was previously married to Ukrainian Paralympic shooter Olga Mustafaieva. He speaks Russian, and does not speak Ukrainian.

Swimming 
Mustafaiev started swimming in 2008 in Sevastopol, Ukraine as part of a rehabilitation regime for a weak back and hand.  While he briefly looked at fencing, he committed to swimming because the issues with his hand made fencing difficult. In 2011, Mustafaiev made his national team debut and was a member of the Ukrainian delegation at the 2011 IPC European Swimming Championships in Berlin, Germany.  He competed in the  Men's 50m Freestyle S4.

Mustafaiev was one of three Ukrainian athletes competing at the 2012 Summer Paralympics from the Crimea region, with the other two including fellow swimmer Dmytro Kryzhanivskyi and shooter Olga Mustafaieva . At the 2012 London, 31-year-old Mustafaiev won gold in the  50 metre freestyle S4 event with a time of 38.26 seconds. He had several other events on his London swimming program including the 100m freestyle, 50m backstroke and 200m freestyle races in London.  He finished eighth and last in the 50m backstroke final with a time of 52.51 seconds.  This time was slower than the heats, where he swam a time of 51.92.  Following the 2012 Games, he was awarded the Order of Merit for his sporting achievements.

In Montreal for the 2013 IPC Swimming World Championships, Mustafaiev claimed gold in the men's 50 freestyle S4 with a time of 37.96 seconds.  He won a silver medal in the men's 100 freestyle S4, losing to Slovenia's Darko Đurić by half a third of a second with a time of 1:27.56 to Duric's 1:27.27.

In October 2014, Mustafaiev, two other Crimean Paralympic and Deaflympic swimmers and a Crimean Paralympic or Deaflympic coach lost their Ukrainian sports scholarship, awarded by a May 2013 presidential decree, followed the annexation of Crimea by the Russian Federation.  Around this time, he also formally switched his nationality, and now represents Russia in international competitions.

Mustafaiev had to miss the 2014 IPC Swimming European Championships, and was unable to defend his world championship title. In 2015, he represented Russia at the IPC World Championships where he won a bronze in the 4 x 50m Freestyle Relay 20 Points.  He failed to make it out of the heats in the 100m Freestyle S4 and the 50m Backstroke S4 events.

References

External links 
 
  Eskender Mustafaev – Russian Federation – Glasgow 2015 IPC Swimming World Championships at the International Paralympic Committee
 Eskender Mustafaiev – Ukraine – Montreal 2013 IPC Swimming World Championships at the International Paralympic Committee

1981 births
Living people
Ukrainian male freestyle swimmers
Russian male freestyle swimmers
Swimmers with disabilities
S4-classified Paralympic swimmers
Paralympic swimmers of Ukraine
Paralympic gold medalists for Ukraine
Swimmers at the 2012 Summer Paralympics
Medalists at the 2012 Summer Paralympics
Medalists at the World Para Swimming Championships
People from Crimea
Paralympic medalists in swimming